DY365 is a 24-hour Assamese satellite news channel of Assam, India. The channel broadcasts national and international news, current affairs and various shows. It was launched on 30 October 2008. DY365 is a unit of Brahmaputra Tele Productions Pvt. Ltd.

Working team
Dipannita Jaiswal (Managing Director)

Programmes

Coordinates
DY 365 is on INSAT G-Sat 30 (C Band) under the following coordinates:

See also
 Jonack
 List of Assamese-language television channels

References

External links
 

Television stations in Guwahati
24-hour television news channels in India
Assamese-language mass media
Assamese-language television channels
Television channels and stations established in 2008
Mass media in Assam